Yōhei Ōshima (大島 洋平, born November 9, 1985 in Japan) is a Japanese professional baseball outfielder for the Chunichi Dragons in Japan's Nippon Professional Baseball. Ōshima has 9 golden glove awards which is the most by any player in Chunichi Dragons history.

Early career
In Grade 4, started playing baseball for the Nagoya Hirabari Junior Baseball club. From middle school, Ōshima played for Tōkai Challenger in the junior boys league as both pitcher and outfielder.

In high school of his third year, Oshima batted lead-off and pitched for Kyōei High School in the summer.

After entering Komazawa University. Oshima consolidated as an outfielder. In the Eastern University League of Tokyo, Oshima hit over .300 for 3 consecutive seasons from fall of 2006 including capturing batting title honours in fall of 2007 with a .395 average. Through his university career, Oshima played 83 games, hit .290 with 1 homerun and 20 RBIs. He was selected in the Best 9 twice.

After graduating university, Oshima joined Nihon Seimei in the industrial league. In his first year he was installed as lead-off hitter and in January 2008, batted .563 in the Japanese National Championships. He was selected in the industrial league Best 9 in the same year.

At the 2009 NPB draft Oshima was selected in the 5th round.

Professional career

On 20 July 2016, against the Hiroshima Carp at Mazda Zoom-Zoom Stadium Hiroshima, he hit for the cycle, the first for Chunichi since Alex Ochoa in 2004.

External links

References

1985 births
Living people
Baseball people from Aichi Prefecture
Komazawa University alumni
Japanese baseball players
Nippon Professional Baseball outfielders
Chunichi Dragons players